Shahrak-e Bidokht (also Romanized as Shahraḵ-e Bīdokht; also known as Beydokht and Bīdokht) is a village in Shaskuh Rural District, Central District, Zirkuh County, South Khorasan Province, Iran. At the 2006 census, its population was 197, in 43 families.

References 

Populated places in Zirkuh County